Darkest Hour is a 2017 war drama film directed by Joe Wright and written by Anthony McCarten. It stars Gary Oldman as Winston Churchill, and is an account of his early days as Prime Minister, as Nazi Germany's Wehrmacht swept across Western Europe, threatening to defeat the United Kingdom during World War II. The film also stars Kristin Scott Thomas, Lily James, Ben Mendelsohn, Stephen Dillane, and Ronald Pickup.

The film had its world premiere at the Telluride Film Festival on 1 September 2017, and also screened at the Toronto International Film Festival. It began a limited release in the United States on 22 November 2017, before expanding on 22 December, and was released on 12 January 2018 in the United Kingdom. The film grossed $149 million worldwide against a budget of $30 million.

Darkest Hour generally received positive reviews, praising in particular Oldman's performance, many who labelled it as one of the best of his career. For his role, he won the Academy Award for Best Actor, the BAFTA Award for Best Actor in a Leading Role, Golden Globe Award for Best Actor – Motion Picture Drama and the Screen Actors Guild Award for Outstanding Performance by a Male Actor in a Leading Role. At the 90th Academy Awards the film earned six nominations, including Best Picture, and won for Best Actor and Best Makeup and Hairstyling. At the 71st British Academy Film Awards it received nine nominations including Best Film and Outstanding British Film.

Accolades

Notes

References

External links 
 

Lists of accolades by film